The Iannotta I-66L San Francesco is a 1960s Italian ultralight designed to be homebuilt from plans.  It has been powered by several flat-four engines in the 65-100 hp range and built in both single and two-seat tandem configurations.  Only small numbers have been completed.

Design and development

The Iannotta I-66 San Francesco acquired its number from the year in which its construction was started (1966).  When its designer and builder ran out of room in his Neapolitan accommodation and was concerned about the noise of engine testing in an urban environment, he was offered space at a Capuchin Friary associated with the Church of Eframo the Elder in Naples.  He and his prototype remained there for two years; since the Capuchins are an offshoot of the Franciscan Order, he named the aircraft after the founder, St Francis of Assisi.

The San Francesco is a conventionally arranged single-engine, high-wing light aircraft. It has constant chord wings with rounded tips, built of wood with plywood leading edges and fabric covered.  Each wing has a V-shaped pair of lift struts attached to the lower fuselage longerons and assisted by a single subsidiary strut from each lift strut upwards to the wing. The flat sided, fabric covered fuselage is a steel tube structure with wooden formers. The square tipped fin has a swept leading edge and a curved fillet; it carries a deep rudder with a straight trailing edge, which extends between the elevators to the bottom of the fuselage. The tailplane, with swept leading edges is wire-braced to the fin. All tail surfaces are fabric covered steel tube structures.

The San Francesco has a conventional fixed tailwheel undercarriage with sprung half axles mounted on central struts below the fuselage.  Its cabin begins ahead of the wing and extends rearwards under it. Versions of the aircraft have flown with at least three variants of the Limbach adaptations of the flat four-cylinder Volkswagen motor: the early San Francescos had the 51 kW (68 hp) 1700E and some later ones 60 kW (80 hp) or 75 kW (100 hp) Limbachs.

Operational history
The San Francesco was designed to be homebuilt from plans. In mid-2010, nine San Francescos were listed on the civil aircraft registers of European countries west of Russia. Four were San Francseco IIIs, three were I-96s and the remainder other variants. The prototype was still flying in 2000. At about that time, the aircraft was being marketed as the Voliamo San Francesco and described as an experimental ultralight.

Variants
Iannotta I-66 San Francesco
prototype, single-seat 
Iannotta I-66 San Francesco
68 hp Limbach 1700E. Two seats, cabin glazing to about 65% chord.
Iannotta I-96 San Francesco
No details available
Voliamo San Francesco III
100 hp Limbach engine. Two-seat: cabin glazing extended rearwards to wing trailing edge.
Voliamo San Francesco 942 AL
No details available

Specifications (I-66L, Limbach SL 1700E)

References

1960s Italian sport aircraft
San Francesco
Single-engined tractor aircraft
High-wing aircraft